In Mexico, the neighborhoods of large metropolitan areas are known as colonias.  One theory suggests that the name, which literally means colony, arose in the late 19th and early 20th centuries, when one of the first urban developments outside Mexico City's core was built by a French immigrant colony. Unlike neighborhoods in the United States, colonias in Mexico City have a specific name which is used in all official documents and postal addresses. Usually, colonias are assigned a specific postal code; nonetheless, in recent urban developments, gated communities are also defined as colonias, yet they share the postal code with adjacent neighborhoods. When writing a postal address the name of the colonia must be specified followed by the postal code and preceding the name of the city. For example:
Calle Dakota 145
Colonia Nápoles 
Alc. Benito Juárez 
03810 Ciudad de México 

Some of the better known colonias include:
 Bosques de las Lomas-Upscale residential neighborhood and business center.
 Centro - Covers the historic downtown (centro histórico) of Mexico City.
 Condesa - Twenties post-Revolution neighborhood.
 Roma - Beaux Arts neighbourhood next to Condesa, one of the oldest in Mexico City.
 Colonia Juarez - includes the Zona Rosa area
 Coyoacán - Town founded by Cortés swallowed by the city in the 1950s, countercultural neighborhood in downtown.
 Del Valle - Upscale residential neighborhood and cradle of José López Portillo and many other important people in Mexican history.
 Jardines del Pedregal - Upscale residential neighborhood with works notable architect by Luis Barragán
 Lomas de Chapultepec - Upscale residential neighborhood and business center
 Nápoles - home of the World Trade Center Mexico City and the iconic Midcentury monument the Polyforum Cultural Siqueiros. 
 San Ángel - Historic residential and shopping area.
 Santa Fe - Financial, business district and upscale residential neighborhood.
 Polanco - Shopping, business and tourist area.
 Tepito - Popular flea market, home to many boxers and street gangs.
 Tlatelolco - Site of the Plaza de las Tres Culturas. High-density neighborhood.
 Zona Rosa - Shopping district and tourist area. Also a gay friendly area, it's technically part of the Colonia Juaréz.

List by borough
A list of colonias (neighborhoods) in Mexico City by borough:

Álvaro Obregón

2da del Moral del Pueblo Tetelpan
2do Reacomodo Tlacuitlapa
8 de Agusto
Abraham M. González
Acueducto
Acuilotla
Alcantarilla
Alfonso XIII
Altavista
Amp. Acueducto
Amp. Alpes
Amp. El Capulín
Amp. Estado de Hidalgo
Amp. Jalalpa
Amp. La Cebada
Amp. La Mexicana
Amp. Las Águilas
Amp. Los Pirules
Amp. Piloto Adolfo López Mateos
Amp. Tepeaca
Amp. Tlacuitlapa
Arcos Centenario
Arturo Martínez
Árvide
Atlamaya
Ave Real
Balcones de Cehuaya
Barrio Alfalfar
Barrio La Otra Banda
Barrio Loreto
Barrio Norte
Barrio Santa María Nonoalco
Bejero del Pueblo de Santa Fe
Belén de las Flores
Bellavista
Bonanza
Bosque
Calzada Jalapa
Campestre
Campo de los Tiros
Cañada 1a Secc.
Cañada 2a Secc.
Canutillo 2a Secc.
Canutillo 3a Secc.
Canutillo
Carlos A. Madrazo
Carola
Cehuaya
Chimalistac
Colina del Sur
Colinas de Tarango
Cooperativa Unión Olivos
Corpus Christi
Cove
Cristo Rey
Cuevitas
Desarollo Urbano
Dos Ríos del Pueblo de Santa Lucía
Ejido San Mateo
El Árbol
El Capulin
El Cuernito
El Mirador del Pueblo Tetelpan
El Pirul 2a Secc.
El Pirul Santa Fe
El Pirul
El Pocito
El Politoco
El Rincón
El Rodeo
El Ruedo
El Tecojote
Encino del Pueblo Tetelpan
Ermita Tizapán
Estado de Hidalgo
Ex-Hacienda de Guadalupe Chimalistac
Ex-Hacienda Tarango
Flor de María
Florida
Francisco Villa
Galeana
Garcimarrero
Golondrinas 1a Secc.
Golondrinas 2a Secc.
Golondrinas
Guadalupe Inn
Heron Proal
Hidalgo
Hogar y Redención
Hueytlale
Industrias Militares de Sedena
Isidora Fabela
Jalalpa Tepito 2a Amp.
Jalalpa Tepito
Jalapa el Grande
Jardines del Pedregal
José María Pino Suárez
La Angostura
La Araña
La Cascada
La Conchita
La Estrella
La Herradura del Pueblo Tetelpan
La Huerta
La Joya
La Joyita del Pueblo Tetelpan
La Loma
La Martinica
La Mexicana 2a Amp.
La Mexicana
La Milagrosa
La Palmita
La Peñita del Pueblo Tetelpan
La Presa
Ladera
Las Águilas 1a Secc.
Las Águilas 2do Secc. Parque
las Águilas 3a Secc. Parque
Las Águilas
Las Américas
Liberación Proletaria
Liberales de 1857
Llano Redondo
Lomas Axomiatla
Lomas de Becerra
Lomas de Cápula
Lomas de Chamontoya
Lomas de Guadalupe
Lomas de la Era
Lomas de las Águilas
Lomas de los Ángeles del Pueblo Tetelpan
Lomas de los Cedros
Lomas de Nuevo México
Lomas de Plateros
Lomas de Puerta Grande
Lomas de San Ángel Inn
Lomas de Santa Fe
Lomas de Tarango
Los Alpes
Los Cedros
Los Gamitos
Los Juristas
Margarita Masa de Juárez
María G. de García Ruiz
Mártires de Tacubaya
Merced Gómez
Miguel Gaona Armenta
Miguel Hidalgo
Minas Cristo Rey
Molino de Rosas
Molino de Santo Domingo
Ocotillos del Pueblo Tetelpan
Olivar de los Padres
Olivar del Conde 1a Secc.
Olivar del Conde 2a Secc.
Palmas Axotitla
Palmas Axotitla
Palmas
Paraíso
Paseo de las Lomas
Piloto Adolfo López Mateos
Pirul Santa Lucía
Pólvora
Ponciano Arriaga
Preconcreto
Presidentes 1a Secc.
Presidentes 2a Secc.
Presidentes
Primera Victoria
Professor J. Arturo López Martínez
Progreso Tizapán
Pueblo Axotla
Pueblo Nuevo
Pueblo San Bartolo Ameyalco
Pueblo Santa Fe
Pueblo Santa Lucía Chantepec
Pueblo Santa Lucía
Pueblo Santa Rosa Xochiac
Pueblo Tetelpan
Pueblo Tizapán
Pueblo Tlacopac
Puente Colorado
Puerta Grande
Punto de Cehuaya
Punto de Cehuaya
Rancho del Carmen del Pueblo San Bartolo Ameyalco
Rancho San Francisco del Pueblo San Bartolo Ameyalco
Reacamodo El Cuernito
Reacomodo Pino Suárez
Reacomodo Valentín Gómez Farías
Real del Monte
Rincón de la Bolsa
Rinconada de Tarango
Rinconada La Cuevita
Sacramento
San Ángel
San Ángel Inn
San Augustín del Pueblo Tetelpan
San Clemente Norte
San Clemente Sur
San Gabriel
San Jerónimo Aculco
San José del Olivar
San Pedro de los Pinos
Santa Fe Centro Ciudad
Santa Fe la Loma
Santa Fe la Loma
Santa Fe Peña Blanca
Santa Fe Tlayapaca
Santa Fe
Santa Lucía Chantepec
Tarango
Tecalcapa del Pueblo Tetelpan
Tecolalco
Tepeaca
Tepopotla
Tizampampano del Pueblo Tetelpan
Tlacoyaque
Tlacuitlapa
Tlacuitlapa
Tlapechico
Tolteca
Torres de Potrero
Torres de Potrero
Villa Progresista
Villa Solidaridad
Villa Verdún
Zenón Delgado

Azcapotzalco
Aguilera
Aldana
Amp. Cosmopolita
Amp. del Gas
Amp. Petrolera
Amp. San Pedro Xalpa
Ángel Zimbrón
Arenal
Barrio de Huautla de Las Salinas
Barrio San Andrés
Barrio San Sebastián
Centro de Azcapotzalco
Clavería
Coltongo
Cosmopolita
del Gas
del Maestro
del Recreo
El Jagüey
Estación Pantaco
Euzkadi
Ferrería
Hacienda del Rosario
Hogar y Seguridad
Ignacio Allende
Industrial Vallejo
ISSS Fam Las Armas
Jardín Azpeitia
La Preciosa
La Raza
Las Salinas
Liberación
Libertad
Los Reyes
Monte Alto
Nextengo
Nueva España
Nuevo Rosario
Nuevo San Rafael
Nuevo Santa Maria
Obrero Popular
Panteón San Isidro
Pasteros
Petrolera
Petrolera
Plenitud
Porvenir
Potrero del Llano
Prados del Rosario
Pro Hogar
Providencia
Pueblo Quieto
Pueblo San Andres de las Salinas
Pueblo Santa Bárbara
Pueblo Santa María Malinalco
Reynosa Tamaulipas
San Álvaro
San Antonio
San Bartolo Cacahualtongo
San Bernabé
San Francisco Tetecala
San Francisco Xocotitla
San Juan Tlihuaca
San Marcos
San Martín Xochinahuac
San Mateo
San Miguel Amantla
San Pedro Xalpa
San Rafael
San Salvador Xochimanco
Santa Apolonia
Santa Catarina
Santa Cruz Acuyacan
Santa Cruz de las Salinas
Santa Inés
Santa Lucía
Santiago Ahuizotla
Santo Domingo
Santo Domingo II
Santo Tomás
Sindicato Mexicano de Electricistas
Tezozómoc
Tierra Nueva
Tlatilco
Trabajadores del Hierro
U. H. Azcapotzalco
U. H. Campo Encantado
U. H. Cruz Roja Tepatongo
U. H. El Rosario
U. H. Francisco Villa
U. H. La Escuadra
U. H. Las Trancas
U. H. Lázaro Cárdenas
U. H. Lerdo de Tejada
U. H. Miguel Hidalgo
U. H. Presidente Madero
U. H. Rinconada
U. H. Rosendo Salazar
U. H. San Isidro
U. H. San Juan Tlihuaca
U. H. San Pablo Xalpa
U. H. Trabajadores de Pemex
U. H. Villas Azcapotzalco
U.H. Cobre de México
U.H. Cuitláhuac
U.H. Jardines de Ceylán
Un Hogar para cada trabajador
Victoria de las Democracias

Benito Juárez
Source:List of Benito Juárez colonias on Eldefe.com, retrieved 2013-10-25
8 de Agosto
Acacias
Actipán
Álamos
Albert
Amp. Nápoles
Américas Unidas
Atenor Salas
Ciudad de los Deportes
Crédito Constructor
Del Carmen
Del Lago
Del Valle Centro
Del Valle Norte
Del Valle Sur
Ermita
Extremadura Insurgentes
General Pedro María Anaya
Independencia
Insurgentes Mixcoac
Insurgentes San Borja
Iztaccíhuatl
Josefa Ortiz de Domínguez
Letrán Valle
Merced Gómez
Miguel Alemán
Miravalle
Mixcoac
Moderna
Nápoles
Narvarte Oriente
Narvarte Poniente
Nativitas
Niños Héroes
Noche Buena
Nápoles
Periodista
Piedad Narvarte
Portales Norte
Portales Oriente
Portales Sur
Postal
Residencial Emperadores
San José Insurgentes
San Juan
San Pedro de los Pinos
San Simón Ticumac
Santa Cruz Atoyac
Santa María Nonoalco
Tlacoquemécatl
Villa de Cortés
Vértiz Narvarte
Xoco
Zacahuitzco

Coyoacán
Adolfo Ruíz Cortínez
Ajusco
Alianza Popular Revolucionaria A
Alianza Popular Revolucionaria B
Alianza Popular Revolucionaria C
Alianza Popular Revolucionaria D
Alianza Popular Revolucionaria Norte
Ampliación Candelaria
Ampliación San Francisco Culhuacán
Atlántida
Avante
Barrio de la Purísima Concepción
Barrio de Oxtopulco
Barrio de San Diego and Barrio de San Mateo Churubusco (in practice, these two neighborhoods are considered as two; however, they are considered as only one from an administrative point of view)
Barrio de San Lucas
Barrio de Santa Catarina
Barrio del Cuadrante de San Francisco
Barrio del Niño Jesús
Barrio Rancho el Rosario
Bosques de Tetlameya
C.T.M. Culhuacán Sec. I
C.T.M. Culhuacán Sec. II
C.T.M. Culhuacán Sec. III
C.T.M. Culhuacán Sec. IV
C.T.M. Culhuacán Sec. IX-A ("CTM" stands for "Confederación de Trabajadores de México," the name of the main union of workers in Mexico)
C.T.M. Culhuacán Sec. IX
C.T.M. Culhuacán Sec. VI
C.T.M. Culhuacán Sec. VII
C.T.M. Culhuacán Sec. VIII
C.T.M. Culhuacán Sec. X-A
C.T.M. Culhuacán Sec. X
Cafetales I
Cafetales II
Campestre Churubusco
Carmen Serdán
Centro Urbano Pedregal de Carrasco
Ciudad Jardín
Copilco Universidad ISSSTE
Copilco Universidad
Country Club
Del Carmen
Del Parque
Educación
Ejido de Santa Úrsula Coapa
El Caracol
El Centinela
El Mirador
El Reloj
El Rosedal
Emiliano Zapata
Espartaco
Ex Ejido De San Francisco Culhuacán
Fortín Chimalistac
Fracc. Campestre Coyoacán
Fracc. Cantil del Pedregal
Fracc. Pedregal de San Francisco ("Fracc." stands for "fraccionamiento", the name commonly applied to housing subdivisions in Mexico City)
Fracc. Romero de Terreros
Girasoles I
Girasoles II
Girasoles III
Hacienda de Coyoacán
Hermosillo
Huayamilpas
Hueso Infonavit
IMAN 580
Insurgentes Cuicuilco
Insurgentes San Ángel
Jardínes de Coyoacán
Jardines del Pedregal de San Ángel Oriente
Jardines del Pedregal de San Ángel
Joyas del Pedregal
Las Cabañas
Las Campanas
Los Cedros
Los Cipreses
Los Ciruelos
Los Fresnos
Los Olivos
Los Robles
Los Sauces
Media Luna
Módulo Social Fovissste
Nueva Díaz Ordaz
Parque San Andrés
Paseos de Taxqueña
Pedregal de Carrasco Sec. Casas A
Pedregal de Carrasco Sec. Casas B
Pedregal de Carrasco Sec. Casas C
Pedregal de Carrasco Sec. I
Pedregal de Carrasco Sec. II
Pedregal de Carrasco Sec. III
Pedregal de Carrasco Sec. IV-A
Pedregal de Carrasco Sec. IV
Pedregal de Carrasco Sec. V
Pedregal de Carrasco Sec. VI
Pedregal de Carrasco Sec. VII
Pedregal de Maurel
Pedregal de Santa Úrsula Coapa
Pedregal del Sur
Petrolera Taxqueña
Piloto V Culhuacán
Popular Emiliano Zapata
Prado Churubusco
Prados Coyoacán
Presidentes Ejidales
Pueblo de Copilco el Alto
Pueblo de Copilco El Bajo
Pueblo de la Candelaria
Pueblo de los Reyes
Pueblo de San Francisco Culhuacán (Barrio de San Juan Magdalena y Barrio de Santa Anita are within this Pueblo/town)
Pueblo de San Pedro Tepetlapa
Pueblo de Santa Úrsula Coapa
Romero de Terreros
Santa Cecilia
Santa Martha del Sur
Santo Domingo de los Reyes
U.H. CROC VI
U.H. STUNAM
U.H. Altillo Universidad (U.H. stands for Unidad Habitacional, "apartment complex")
U.H. Candelaria
U.H. Copilco 300
U.H. Copilco Universidad
U.H. Ermita Churubusco
U.H. Integración Latinoamericana
U.H. los Reyes
U.H. Monte de Piedad
U.H. Prolongación División del Norte
U.H. San Pablo
U.H. Santa Rosa Coapa
U.H. Taxqueña 1802, 1810-Bis, 1818
U.H. Tlalpan (Centro Urbano)
U.H. Universidad 2016, 202
Vejo Ejido de Santa Úrsula
Villa Coyoacán
Villa Olímpica
Villa Quietud
Villa San Francisco
Villas del Pedregal
Vistas de Maurel
Xotepingo

Cuajimalpa de Morelos

col. Abdias García Soto
col. Adolfo Lopez Mateos
col. Agua Bendita
col. Amado Nervo
col. Amp. El Yaqui
col. Amp. Memetla
col. Bosques de Las Lomas
col. Campestre Palo Alto
col. Contadero
col. Cooperativa Palo Alto
col. Cruz Blanca
col. Cuajimalpa
col. El Ébano
col. El Molinito
col. El Molino
col. El Tianguillo
col. El Yaqui
col. Granjas Navidad
col. Granjas Palo Alto
col. Jesús del Monte
col. La Manzanita
col. La Pila
col. La Venta
col. Las Lajas
col. Las Maromas
col. Las Tinajas
col. Locaxco
col. Loma del Padre
col. Lomas de Chamizal
col. Lomas de Memetla
col. Lomas de San Pedro
col. Lomas de Vista Hermosa
col. Manzanastitla
col. Memetla
col. San José de Los Cedros
col. Santa Fe
col. Tepetongo
col. Xalpa
col. Zentlápatl
Pueblo San Lorenzo Acopilco
Pueblo San Mateo Tlaltenango
Pueblo San Pablo Chimalpa
Pueblo San Pedro Cuajimalpa
Pueblo Santa Rosa Xochiac

Cuahtémoc
The neighborhoods of the Cuahtémoc borough of Mexico City are:

Gustavo A. Madero
6 De Junio7 De Noviembre15 De Agosto25 De Julio51 LegislaturaAcueducto De Guadalupe (Rdcial)Acueducto De Guadalupe (U Hab)AhuehuetesAidee Solís Cárdenas-Matías Romero (U Hab)Aragon InguaranAragon La Villa (Aragon)Arboledas De CuautepecArboledas De Cuautepec (Ampl)Arroyo Guadalupe (U Hab)Belisario DominguezBenito JuarezBenito Juarez (Ampl)BondojitoC T M Aragon (U)C T M Aragon Ampliacion (U)Camino A San Juan De Aragon (Pblo)Campestre Aragon ICampestre Aragon IiCapultitlanCasas Aleman (Ampl) ICasas Aleman (Ampl) IiCastillo ChicoCastillo GrandeCastillo Grande (Ampl)Cerro PrietoChalma De Guadalupe IChalma De Guadalupe IiChurubusco TepeyacCocoyotesCocoyotes (Ampl)Compositores MexicanosConstitucion De La RepublicaCooperativa Luis Enrique Rodríguez Orozco (U Hab)Ctm Atzacoalco (U Hab)Ctm El Risco (U Hab)Cuautepec De MaderoCuautepec El Alto (Pblo)Cuchilla Del TesoroCuchilla La JoyaDefensores De La RepublicaDel BosqueDel ObreroDm NacionalEduardo Molina I (U Hab)Eduardo Molina Ii (U Hab)Ejidos San Juan De Aragon 1a Seccion (U Hab)Ejidos San Juan De Aragon 2a Seccion (U Hab)El ArbolilloEl Arbolillo 1 (U Hab)El Arbolillo 2 (U Hab)El Arbolillo 3 (U Hab)El CarmenEl Coyol (U Hab)El OlivoEmiliano ZapataEmiliano Zapata (Ampl)EstanzuelaEstanzuelaEx-Escuela De TiroFaja De OroFernando Casas AlemanFerrocarrilera InsurgentesFovissste Cuchilla (U Hab)Fovissste Rio De Guadalupe (U Hab)Fovisste Aragon (U Hab)Gabriel HernandezGabriel Hernandez (Ampl) IGabriel Hernandez (Ampl) IiGeneral Felipe BerriozabalGertrudis Sanchez 1a SeccionGertrudis Sanchez 2a SeccionGertrudis Sanchez 3a SeccionGraciano SanchezGranjas Modernas-San Juan De Aragon (Ampl)Guadalupe InsurgentesGuadalupe ProletariaGuadalupe Proletaria (Ampl)Guadalupe TepeyacGuadalupe VictoriaGuadalupe Victoria IIHeroe De NacozariHeroes De ChapultepecHornos De Aragon (U Hab)Indeco (U Hab)Industrial IIndustrial IiInfonavit (U Hab)Infonavit Camino San Juan De Aragon (U Hab)Infonavit Loreto Fabela (U Hab)Jaime S Emiliano GJorge NegreteJose Maria Morelos Y Pavon I (U Hab)Jose Maria Morelos Y Pavon Ii (U Hab)Joyas Vallejo (U Hab)Juan De Dios Batiz (U Hab)Juan Gonzalez RomeroJuventino RosasLa Candelaria Ticoman (Barr)La CasildaLa Cruz (Barr)La Esmeralda (U Hab)La Esmeralda ILa Esmeralda IiLa Esmeralda IiiLa ForestalLa Forestal 1La Forestal 2La Forestal 3La JoyaLa JoyitaLa Laguna Ticoman (Barr)La MalincheLa PastoraLa Patera-Condomodulos (U Hab)La PraderaLa Pradera I (U Hab)La Pradera Ii (U Hab)La Purisima Ticoman (Barr)Lindavista ILindavista IiLindavista Vallejo (U Hab)Loma De La PalmaLomas De CuautepecLomas De San Juan Ixhuatepec (2a Seccion)Los Olivos (U Hab)Luis Donaldo ColosioaMagdalena De Las SalinasMalacatesMalacates AmpliaciónMalvinas MexicanasMartin Carrera IMartin Carrera IiMartires De Rio BlancoMartires De Rio Blanco (Ampl)Maximino Avila CamachoNarciso Bassols (U Hab)Nueva Atzacoalco INueva Atzacoalco IiNueva Atzacoalco IiiNueva Industrial Vallejo (Fracc)Nueva TenochtitlanNueva VallejoPalmatitlaPanamericanaPanamericana (Ampl)Parque MetropolitanoPemex Lindavista (U Hab)Planetario LindavistaPlaza Oriente (Rdcial)Prados De CuautepecProgreso Nacional (Ampl)Progreso Nacional IProgreso Nacional IiProvidencia (Ampl)Providencia IProvidencia IiProvidencia IiiQuetzalcoatl 3Residencial La Escalera (Fracc)Residencial ZacatencoRevolucion Imss (U Hab)Rosas Del TepeyacSalvador Diaz MironSan AntonioSan Bartolo Atepehuacan (Pblo)San Felipe De Jesus ISan Felipe De Jesus IiSan Felipe De Jesus IiiSan Felipe De Jesus IvSan Jose De La EscaleraSan Jose TicomanSan Juan De Aragon (Pblo)San Juan De Aragon 1a Seccion (U Hab) ISan Juan De Aragon 1a Seccion (U Hab) IiSan Juan De Aragon 2a Seccion (U Hab) ISan Juan De Aragon 2a Seccion (U Hab) IiSan Juan De Aragon 3a Seccion (U Hab) ISan Juan De Aragon 3a Seccion (U Hab) IiSan Juan De Aragon 4a Y 5a Seccion (U Hab) ISan Juan De Aragon 4a Y 5a Seccion (U Hab) IiSan Juan De Aragon 6a Seccion (U Hab) ISan Juan De Aragon 6a Seccion (U Hab) IiSan Juan De Aragon 7 Secc (U Hab) ISan Juan De Aragon 7 Secc (U Hab) IiSan Juan Iii (U Hab)San Juan Y Guadalupe Ticoman (Barr)San Miguel CuautepecSan Miguel-La Escalera (Barr)San Pedro El ChicoSan Pedro Zacatenco (Pblo)San Rafael Ticoman (Barr)Santa Isabel Tola (Pblo)Santa RosaSantiago AtepetlacSantiago Atepetlac (La Selvita) (U Hab)Santiago Atzacoalco (Pblo)Sct (U Hab)Siete MaravillasSolidaridad NacionalSutic Vallejo (U Hab)Tablas De San AgustinTepetatalTepeyac InsurgentesTlacaelelTlacamacaTlalpexcoTorres De Quiroga (U Hab)Torres De San Juan (U Hab)Torres De San Juan 1b (U Hab)Torres Lindavista (Fracc)Tres EstrellasTriunfo De La RepublicaValle De MaderoValle Del TepeyacVallejo IVallejo IiVallejo PonienteVasco De QuirogaVeronica CastroVilla De AragonVilla De Aragon (Fracc)Villa Gustavo A MaderoVilla HermosaVista HermosaZona Escolar IZona Escolar IIZona Escolar Oriente
Villa de Guadalupe, Mexico City

Iztacalco
Viaducto Piedad

Iztapalapa

San Miguel
Santa Cruz Meyehualco
Lomas Estrella

Magdalena Contreras

San Jerónimo Lídice

Miguel Hidalgo
Bosques de las Lomas
Lomas de Chapultepec
Granada, Ampl. Granada
Pensil
Polanco
San Miguel Chapultepec
Tacuba
Tacubaya

Milpa Alta

San Pedro Atocpan
Villa Milpa Alta (formerly called Malacachtepec)
San Bartolome Xicomulco
San Francisco Tecoxpa
Santa Ana Tlacotenco
San Lorenzo Tlacoyucan
San Juan Tepanahuac
San Agustin Ohtenco
San Antonio Tecómitl
San Pablo Oztotepec
San Jerónimo Miacantla

Tláhuac

Santiago Zapotitlán
San Francisco Tlaltenco
Santa Catarina Yechuizotl
San Nicolas Tetelco
San Juan Ixtayopan
San Andrés Mixquic
San Pedro Tláhuac

Tlalpan
Cantera Puente de Piedra 
Pueblo Quieto
Toriello Guerra 
Huipulco
La Joya 
Club de Golf
Hospitales
Tlalpan Centro

Venustiano Carranza

Magdalena Mixhuca
Jardín Balbuena
La Candelaria de los Patos
El Parque
Jamaica
Zaragoza
Romero Rubio
Gómez Farias
Lorenzo Boturini
Merced Balbuena
Artes Gráficas
Federal

Xochimilco
La Guadalupita

See also

Boroughs of the Mexican Federal District

References

External links

neighborhoods
 
Cities in Mexico
Subdivisions of Mexico
Mexico City metropolitan area